Gambugliano is a town and comune in the province of Vicenza, Veneto, Italy. It is southwest of SP46.

Sources
(Google Maps)

Cities and towns in Veneto